Jacques Grégoire (date of birth unknown, died 1928) was a French boxer. He competed in the men's lightweight event at the 1920 Summer Olympics.

References

External links

Year of birth missing
1928 deaths
French male boxers
Olympic boxers of France
Boxers at the 1920 Summer Olympics
Place of birth missing
Lightweight boxers